National Institute of Cancer Research & Hospital (NICRH) is dedicated to cancer patient management, education and research. This is the only tertiary level center of the country engaged in multidisciplinary cancer patient management.
It started its activity in a tin-shade building of Dhaka Medical College and Hospital in 1982, soon it is shifted to the present location at Mohakhali in 1986. According to a Memorandum of Understanding signed between the Ministry of Health and the Rotary Club of Dhaka the latter built the Rotary Cancer Detection Unit (RCDU) and the Cancer Institute started working as an outdoor cancer detection unit only. In 1991, 50 bed indoor facilities incorporated. In 1994 the cancer institute renamed as National Institute of Cancer Research & Hospital (NICRH) and the first radiation treatment was applied to a patient in 1995 with a Cobalt 60 Teletherapy machine.
With the provision of support from the Saudi Fund for Development (SFD), the up-gradation works of this Institute to 300 bedded Center has been completed. In April 2015 it was upgraded to a 300-bed hospital. In 2019 the Hon'ble Health Minister Mr. Jahid Maleque M.P. consented to convert NICRH as a 500-bed hospital and the work is almost completed.

NICRH offers the following courses:
 MD in Radiation Oncology
 MD in Medical Oncology
 MS in Surgical Oncology

Activities
 All diagnostic activities- for cancer detection
 All kinds of treatments- surgery, radiotherapy, chemotherapy, etc.
 Hospital Based Cancer Registry
 It has formulated National Guidelines for high-quality, cost-effective cancer treatment plans for 4 common cancers of our country.
 Different training programs- for health professionals –histopathologists, gynecologists, nurses, technologists, community leaders, etc.
 Organizing tobacco prevention & cessation programs in the community.
 Participation in national activities- such as observance of World Cancer Day, World Pediatric Cancer Day, No Tobacco Day, Breast & Cervical cancer awareness month, and chalking out of special Breast Cancer Screening Campaign in the victory month of December from 2015.
 Telemedicine services
 Publication of NICRH journal
 Palliative care services
 Academic activities

Departments of NICRH
 Department of Radiation Oncology
 Department of Medical Oncology
 Department of Surgical Oncology
 Department of Gyanecological Oncology
 Department of Cancer Epidemiology
 Department of Haematology
 Department of Pediatric Haematology & Oncology
 Department of Radiology & Imaging
 Department of Histopathology
 Department of Cytopathology
 Department of Laboratory Medicine
 Department of Microbiology
 Department of Immunology and Molecular Biology
 Department of Blood Transfusion Medicine
 Department of ENT Oncology
 Department of Dental and Faciomaxillary Surgical Oncology
 Department of Plastic and Reconstructive Surgical Oncology
 Department of Orthopedic Surgical Oncology
 Department of Genito-urinary Surgical Oncology
 Department of Anesthesiology
 Department of Physical medicine & rehabilitation
 Department of Psychotherapy
 Department of Emergency Oncology

References

Cancer hospitals
Hospital buildings completed in 1982
Hospitals in Dhaka
Research institutes established in 1982
Medical research institutes in Bangladesh
1982 establishments in Bangladesh
Hospitals established in 1982